Catamayo Canton is a canton of Loja Province in Ecuador. Its seat is Catamayo. It is located in the north of the province, bordered by the cantons of Loja, Gonzanamá, Olmedo, and Chaguarpamba.  In it is located the largest and most fertile valley of the province, and is the location of the Monterrey Sugar Cane Processing Plant, a major sugarcane operation which is a financial boon to the province and country.  The town of La Toma in Catamayo is the seat of the city of Loja's airport.

Geography
The canton covers 648 km² between altitudes of 500 - 1700 m, and has a population of about 27,412.

Main exports are sugar and bananas

Attractions include:
 Boqueron River - with sandy beaches and warm water, the river is a popular tourist destination

Demographics
Ethnic groups as of the Ecuadorian census of 2010:
Mestizo  88.0%
Afro-Ecuadorian  7.5%
White  3.8%
Indigenous  0.3%
Montubio  0.3%
Other  0.3%

References

Cantons of Loja Province